Pioneer Academy is an independent college-preparatory school for PK-12 grades located in Wayne, in Passaic County, New Jersey, United States. The Pioneer Academy curriculum focuses on studies of science, mathematics, cultural studies, and language. The school was founded in 1999 and moved from Clifton to its Wayne campus at the start of the 2013-14 school year.

As of the 2019–20 school year, the school had an enrollment of 300 students (plus 23 in PreK) and 29.5 classroom teachers (on an FTE basis), for a student–teacher ratio of 10.2:1. The school's student body was 77.7% (233) White, 3% (9) Black, 14.3% (43) Asian, 2% (6) Hispanic and 2.7% (8) two or more races.

History 
Pioneer is a co-educational day school for PreK-12 and a boys-only boarding school for high school students. The school is located in Wayne, New Jersey, about 30 minutes west of New York City.

1999 – Established as a middle school at 366 Clifton Avenue in Clifton, New Jersey
2006 – Opened second campus at 1255 Main Avenue in Clifton. Began catering to Pre-K through 12th grade.
2008 – Gained I-20 issuing privileges
2009 – Started accepting international students
2011 – Became an all-boys high school. Remained co-ed middle school. The elementary school temporarily closed.
2013 – Moved to 164 Totowa Road in Wayne, New Jersey, in facilities offering on-campus housing for students.
2014 – Changed school name from Pioneer Academy of Science to Pioneer Academy
2014 - Became Co-ed Pre-K through 12th Grade.
2017 - Pre-K Montessori program opened.

Sports 
Students are encouraged to participate in the school's sporting activities, both on and off campus (such as Model UN, stock market club, and more). Pioneer students currently participate in basketball, soccer, wrestling, and tae kwon do.

References

External links
School Homepage

1999 establishments in New Jersey
Educational institutions established in 1999
Private elementary schools in New Jersey
Private middle schools in New Jersey
Private high schools in Passaic County, New Jersey
Wayne, New Jersey
Turkish-American history